"Sveti Nikola" (trans. "Saint Nicholas") is a single from the Serbian and Yugoslav hard rock band Kerber.

The song was released as a part of the box set Sabrana dela, which featured remastered versions of all six studio albums released by Kerber and "Sveti Nikola" on a separate disc.

The song was composed by the band's guitarist Tomislav Nikolić, being the first Kerber song with music not credited to the entire band. Lyrics for the song were written by Dejan Perašević.

Track listing

Personnel
Goran Šepa - vocals
Tomislav Nikolić - guitar
Branislav Božinović - keyboards

Additional personnel
Dejan Ilić - producer
Goran Šimpraga - co-producer
Bob Ludwig - mastered by

References

Sabrana dela at Discogs

External links
Sabrana dela at Discogs

2009 singles
Kerber songs
2009 songs